Șimișna is a commune located in Sălaj County, Transylvania, Romania. It is composed of two villages, Hășmaș (Alsóhagymás) and Șimișna. These were part of Rus Commune until 2002, when they were split off.

References

Communes in Sălaj County
Localities in Transylvania